Santa Joana may refer to:
 Santa Joana (parish) - in Aveiro Municipality, Portugal
 Santa Joana River - river in Espírito Santo, Brazil
 Santa Joana, Princesa de Portugal - a Portuguese princess considered holy by the  Catholic Church
 Santa Joana, work by George Bernard Shaw
 Santa Joana, Portuguese for Jeanne d'Arc